40 Wall Street, also known as the Trump Building, is a  neo-Gothic skyscraper on Wall Street between Nassau and William streets in the Financial District of Manhattan in New York City.  Erected in 1929–1930 as the headquarters of the Manhattan Company, the building was formerly known as the Bank of Manhattan Trust Building and the Manhattan Company Building. 40 Wall Street was designed by H. Craig Severance with Yasuo Matsui and Shreve & Lamb. The building is a New York City designated landmark and is listed on the National Register of Historic Places (NRHP); it is also a contributing property to the Wall Street Historic District, an NRHP district.

The building is on an L-shaped site. While the lower section has a facade of limestone, the upper stories incorporate a buff-brick facade and contain numerous setbacks. Other features of the facade include spandrels between the windows on each story, which are recessed behind the vertical piers on the facade. At the top of the building is a pyramid with a spire at its pinnacle. The Manhattan Company's main banking room and board room were on the lower floors, while the remaining stories were rented to tenants. The former banking room was converted into a Duane Reade store.

Plans for 40 Wall Street were revealed in April 1929, with the Manhattan Company as the primary tenant, and the structure was completed in May 1930. 40 Wall Street and the Chrysler Building were competing for the distinction of world's tallest building at the time of both buildings' construction, though the Chrysler Building ultimately won that title. In its early years, 40 Wall Street suffered from low tenancy rates, as well as a plane crash in 1946. Ownership of the building and the land underneath it, as well as the leasehold on the building, has changed several times throughout its history. Since 1982, the building has been owned by two German companies. The leasehold was held by interests on behalf of former Philippine president Ferdinand Marcos in the mid-1980s, and a company controlled by developer and later U.S. president Donald Trump assumed the lease in 1995.

Site 
40 Wall Street is in the Financial District of Manhattan, in the middle of the block bounded by Pine Street to the north, William Street to the east, Wall Street to the south, and Nassau Street to the west. The site is L-shaped, with a longer facade on Pine Street than on Wall Street. Originally, the site measured  on Pine Street and 150 feet on Wall Street.

40 Wall Street is surrounded by numerous buildings, including Federal Hall National Memorial and 30 Wall Street to the west; 44 Wall Street and 48 Wall Street to the east; 28 Liberty Street to the north; and 23 Wall Street and 15 Broad Street to the south. The site slopes down southward, so that the Pine Street entrance is on the second floor while the Wall Street entrance is on the first floor. Prior to the current building's completion, the site had been occupied by numerous smaller office buildings. The southern part of the site contained the eight-story Gallatin Bank Building at 34–36 Wall Street, designed by Cady, Berg & See and completed in 1887; the nine-story Marshall Field Building at 38 Wall Street; the Bank of the Manhattan Company's original headquarters at 40 Wall Street; and a 13-story building to the east. The northern portion contained a 13-story building at 25 Pine Street, a 12-story building at 27–29 Pine Street, and the 13-story Redmond Building at 31–33 Pine Street.

Architecture 

The building was designed by lead architect H. Craig Severance, associate architect Yasuo Matsui, and consulting architects Shreve & Lamb. Moran & Proctor were consulting engineers for the foundation, the Starrett Corporation was the builder, and Purdy and Henderson were the structural engineers. The interior was designed by Morrell Smith with Walker & Gillette. Many engineers and contractors were involved in various other aspects of the building's construction.

While 40 Wall Street's facade has "modernized French Gothic" features, its massing is designed more similarly to the Art Deco style, and there are also elements of classical architecture as well as abstract shapes. According to author Daniel M. Abramson, the classically-styled details at the base were intended to provide "context and support", while the Gothic-style roof was intended to emphasize the building's height. 40 Wall Street is 70 stories tall, with two additional basement stories. The building's pinnacle reaches , briefly making it the world's tallest building upon its completion.

Form 
The massing of 40 Wall Street, like that of many other early-20th-century skyscrapers in New York City, is designed as a standalone tower. 40 Wall Street is one of several skyscrapers in the city that have pyramidal roofs. The building's articulation consists of three horizontal sections similar to the components of a column, namely a base, shaft, and capital. The floors at the six-story base cover the entire "L"-shaped lot, while the seventh through 35th stories (making up the middle section) are shaped in a "U", with two wings of different lengths facing west. The seventh through 35th stories occupy nearly the entire lot. Above the 35th story, the building rises as a smaller, square tower through the 62nd story.

40 Wall Street incorporates several setbacks to conform with the 1916 Zoning Resolution. On the Wall Street side, the central portion of the facade is recessed through the 26th floor, while symmetrical pavilions project slightly on either side, with setbacks above the 17th, 19th, and 21st floors. The entire Wall Street facade has setbacks above the 26th, 33rd and 35th floors. The Pine Street facade is asymmetrical, with the western pavilion being much longer; it has a setback above the 12th floor. This side also contains setbacks above the 17th, 19th, 23rd, 26th, 28th, and 29th floors. The pairs of projecting pavilions on both sides are connected at the eighth floor by a dormer.

The building's west-facing wings are of different lengths; the northern wing is significantly longer and has cooling systems atop it, but both wings have minor setbacks above the 26th and 33rd floors, and rise only to the 35th floor. The eastern facade does not have any setbacks below the 35th story.

Facade 
40 Wall Street's exterior curtain wall is composed of two layers of brick; the inner layer provides fireproofing, while the outer layer is the exterior cladding. In general, the facade is composed of buff-colored brick, as well as decorative elements made of terracotta and brick. The vertical bays, which contain the building's windows, are separated by piers. The piers are flat, a characteristic of the Art Deco style. Spandrel panels, which separate the rows of windows on each floor, are generally recessed behind the piers; the spandrels are generally darker on upper stories. The building's window openings, initially composed of one-over-one sash windows, were later replaced by numerous types of window-pane arrangements or by louvers.

Base 

The first through sixth stories contain a limestone-and-granite facade. On the first story, the podium on the facade's Wall Street elevation is made of granite. The second- to fifth-floor facades on both sides consist of a colonnade with pilasters made of limestone. The colonnades were intended to resemble those in Greek temples. During the design of the building, Matsui adjusted the colonnades so they matched the dimensions of the nearby Subtreasury building (now Federal Hall).

On the Wall Street side, the first floor initially had a central entryway with three bronze-and-glass doors, flanked by numerous entrances to the elevator lobby and the lower banking room. Double-height bronze-and-glass windows spanned the second and third floors, while cast-iron windows were on the fourth through sixth floors. Above the central entrance was Elie Nadelman's Oceanus sculpture (also called Aquarius); the sculpture was a  bronze depiction of Oceanus, a Greek Titan pictured on a 19th-century stock certificate issued by the Manhattan Company. The Oceanus sculpture had been removed by the late 20th century. Between 1961 and 1963, Carson, Lundin & Shaw, added the granite cladding and reconfigured the doorways on the first floor, as well as replaced the second- through sixth-floor windows. By 1995, the entrance had been configured with seven bronze rectangular doors and three revolving doors, recessed behind the main facade. Letters reading "The Trump Building" are above the first floor, while the fourth floor has a pair of flagpoles.

The Pine Street elevation was arranged similarly to the Wall Street elevation and was similarly redesigned from 1961 to 1963. The Pine Street elevation rises above a low stylobate, in contrast to the Wall Street elevation, which rises above a podium. A  clock existed on the Pine Street facade from 1967 to 1993. This portion of the facade consists of either 10 or 11 bays. At ground level, this includes an entrance to the main elevator lobby, a service entrance, and storefronts slightly above grade. As with the Wall Street side, the fourth floor contains a pair of flagpoles.

Upper stories 
The eighth through 35th stories comprise the midsection of the building. There are eight flagpoles on the ninth floor of the Wall Street side, four on each pavilion. On the 19th floor of the Pine Street side, there are louvers in place of window openings. On the 36th through 62nd stories, there are brick spandrels between the windows on each story. The spandrels above the 52nd through 57th floors are made of terracotta; above the 58th through 60th floors, terracotta with buttresses; and above the 61st and 62nd floors, darker bricks with pediments and rhombus patterns.

The building contains a pyramidal roof originally made of lead-coated copper. The roof contains French Renaissance-style detail, a design element intended to make the building appear much older than it actually was. These details included diaperwork patterns, terraces supported by buttresses, and small dormer windows. There is a cornice surrounding the roof. On top is a spire that contains a flagpole and a glass lantern.

Features 
The building's frame is made of steel. As originally arranged, 40 Wall Street hosted the Manhattan Company's banking facilities on the first through sixth floors; offices on its middle floors; and machinery, an observation deck, and recreation areas on the top floors. When 40 Wall Street was completed, it could accommodate 10,000 employees.

Lower stories 
Like other early-20th-century skyscrapers in the Financial District, the lobby of 40 Wall Street contained classical elements such as moldings, pilasters, columns, and heavy doorframes. The ground story was highly decentralized, with seven entrances from Wall Street, which originally led to various vestibules. The westernmost entrance led to a private foyer with its own elevator, while the easternmost entrance connected with the elevator banks on the eastern side of the building. Two ground-level banking rooms extended northward to Pine Street: one at the center and one on the west. There was also originally space for brokerage-house messengers. A wide marble stair from ground level led up to the main banking room on the second floor. The modern design of the lobby dates to a 1999 renovation by Der Scutt. Following Scutt's renovation, the lobby was redecorated with bronze and marble surfaces, and it contains escalators to the second floor.

The room could be accessed from ground level or directly from Pine Street. The Pine Street entrance contained a foyer with two pairs of octagonal black-marble Ionic columns, while the Wall Street side of the room contained veined octagonal columns. The room itself consists of a main hall below five groin vaults, flanked by arcades that lead to smaller vaulted spaces. The main hall contained desks for tellers. To the north and south were two platforms for the officers of the Manhattan Company's subsidiaries, where officers and customers could meet privately in wood-paneled spaces. The walls were once decorated with three murals by Ezra Winter, depicting various scenes from the history of the Financial District, although Winter's murals have since been removed. , the second floor is occupied by a Duane Reade convenience store. 

A pair of stairs on the banking room's south wall flanks the escalators and leads up to what was originally the officers' quarters, a rectangular room with five white-marble columns. This space had three doorways that led to private offices of Manhattan Company executives; the doorways to these offices contained round carvings with symbols of various economic sectors. 

Stairs from the ground level led to the two basement stories which contained the Manhattan Company's vaults.  Under the lobby was a main vault that stored the company's own securities and funds. A safe-deposit vault for members of the public, with a  door, was below the Manhattan Company's vault.

Upper stories 
On the fourth floor was the boardroom of the Manhattan Company, designed in the Georgian style as an imitation of Independence Hall's Signers' Room. It contains several elements of the Doric order, such as columns, pilasters, and a frieze. Wooden doors and fireplaces with segmental arches are on the eastern wall, while false windows are on the western wall. The space also included a fireplace, Chippendale furniture, and a blue rug. According to the Manhattan Company's magazine, the boardroom's design "recaptured the artistic spirit of the days of our institution's founding".

The offices of the Manhattan Company's officers overlooked the Wall Street entrance. The offices were furnished with such details as patterned carpets, soft chairs, and single desks, which were intended to evoke a feeling of luxury. According to Architecture and Building magazine, the executive offices' furnishings were intended as a "pleasingly striking contrast to the modern severity of the usual treatment of financial district structures". On the sixth floor was a trading floor for the International Manhattan Company, Inc.. All of the offices on the upper stories were served by a pneumatic tube mail system; according to Matsui, the system was intended to accommodate financial tenants "whose functions require rapid transfer of stocks and papers". The pneumatic-tube system delivered mail to and from terminals on the building's mezzanine, precluding the need for messengers to use the elevators or overcrowd the lobby.

The 26th and 27th stories housed the Luncheon Club of Wall Street, a members-only private club, built upon the suggestion of William A. Starrett, the building's general contractor. The Luncheon Club occupied a Colonial-style space designed by Matsui and Robert L. Powell, which included an entrance hall and a main dining room covered in wood, as well as private dining rooms with wallpaper. The 55th floor was entirely occupied by the Manhattan Company's officers' club, which included a dining room. The officers' club was designed in a Colonial style with Windsor chairs, a fireplace, and a ceiling with fake wood beams. Another members-only dining club, the Rookery Club, was located on the 58th story. The observation deck was closed to the public sometime after World War II.

History 
The Manhattan Company was established by Aaron Burr in 1799, ostensibly to provide clean water to Lower Manhattan. The company's true focus was banking, and it served as a competitor to Alexander Hamilton's Bank of New York, which previously held a monopoly over banking in New York City. The Manhattan Company was headquartered at a row house at 40 Wall Street, which was the company's "office of discount and deposit". The bank remained on the site up until the present skyscraper was constructed. By the early 20th century, the company was growing quickly, having acquired numerous other banks.

Development

Planning 
The idea for the current skyscraper was devised by banker George L. Ohrstrom. Ohrstrom began land acquisition for the building in 1928, originally going under the name 36 Wall Street Corporation. Stakeholders in the corporation included Ohrstrom and the builders Starrett Brothers (later Starrett Corporation). In September of that year, the 36 Wall Street Corporation acquired 34–36 Wall Street under a 93-year lease to the Iselin estate. At the time, the syndicate hoped to build a 20-story building. The plans had been updated, and the syndicate was now envisioning a 45-story building. In January 1929, the 36 Wall Street Corporation planned a bond issue to fund the building's construction. That March, Ohrstrom announced that H. Craig Severance would design a 47-story structure at 36 Wall Street. The syndicate bought 25 Pine Street the same month. 

Shortly after Severance's original plans were announced, the skyscraper was modified to have 60 floors, but it was still shorter than the  Woolworth Building and the then-under-construction,  Chrysler Building. Plans for a 64-story skyscraper were announced after the Manhattan Company agreed to relocate to the new building in early April 1929. By April 8, Ohrstrom and Severance were planning to make the new skyscraper the world's tallest building. It was also announced that the Manhattan Company would be 36 Wall Street's main tenant and that the new building would be known as the Bank of Manhattan Building or the Manhattan Company Building. The height of the building was made possible by the  lot, which was one of the densely-developed Financial District's largest lots.

The builders intended to spend large sums to reduce the construction period to one year, allowing rental tenants to move into the building sooner. By mid-April 1929, the tenants of existing buildings had moved elsewhere. The Manhattan Company and Chrysler buildings started competing for the distinction of "world's tallest building". The "Race into the Sky", as popular media called it at the time, was representative of the country's optimism in the 1920s, fueled by the building boom in major cities. The Manhattan Company Building was revised to  later in April 1929, which would make it the world's tallest. Severance then publicly claimed the title of the world's tallest building, but the Starrett Corporation denied all allegations that the plans had been changed.

Construction 

Construction of the Manhattan Company Building began in May 1929. By that time, the syndicate developing the building was known as the 40 Wall Street Corporation, and the building was also known as 40 Wall Street. The same month, the Manhattan Company leased its lots at 40–42 Wall Street and 35–39 Pine Street to the 40 Wall Street Corporation for 93 years. Ownership would be divided among the Manhattan Company, Iselin estate, and the 40 Wall Street Corporation, with the Manhattan Company holding a plurality stake. Simultaneously, the U.S. government invited bids on the adjoining building at 28–30 Wall Street, then occupied by a federal assay office. The assay office plot was reserved for future expansion, rather than being part of the new skyscraper. The Manhattan Company moved to a temporary headquarters during the project.

Foundation work 
Excavations for 40 Wall Street were complicated by numerous factors. Furthermore, the builders had a 12-month deadline, requiring them to plan the entire project backward from the planned completion date. Starrett Brothers had drawn up a construction schedule for 40 Wall Street, which indicated that structural-steel installation would commence in June 1929 and that all work would be completed no later than May 1, 1930. The project employed 24 timekeepers and auditors, who checked employees' attendance, as well as seven job runners, who delivered architectural drawings and ensured that materials were delivered.

To save money and time, the foundation of 40 Wall Street was constructed at the same time that buildings on the site were being cleared. The old Manhattan Company building was the last to be cleared. Caisson construction could not be used to excavate the site since the existing foundation contained heavy masonry blocks. To ensure that the foundation could adequately support the structure, temporary lighter footings were installed during the demolition of the old buildings and construction of the first 20 stories, and permanent heavy footings were installed afterward. The weight of the existing 12-story building on the site was used to drill the new building's foundations into the ground. Afterward, a concrete floor was poured into the excavation, which was then enclosed by a concrete cofferdam.

Superstructure 
In July 1929, the builders held a ceremony where William A. Starrett, head of the Starrett Corporation, drove the first rivet into the building's frame. Starrett received a $5 million loan the same month to finance the building. Work on 40 Wall Street progressed quickly, and the contractors completed four stories each week. The site was active 24 hours a day, with 2,300 workers working in three shifts, and interior furnishing progressed as the steel frame rose. Workers used passenger elevators to transport materials, obviating the need for temporary construction cranes. Matsui described the steel frame as a "web system of rigidity", with joints and diagonal beams providing both lateral bracing and wind bracing. The steel frame for 40 Wall Street was manufactured in Bethlehem, Pennsylvania; transported to Jersey City, New Jersey, using 800 railcars; shipped across the Hudson River via barge; and transported from the dock to the construction site via truck. Derricks then lifted the steel beams into place, where groups of four workers riveted the steel beams onto the frame. As the tower rose, the derricks were themselves lifted two stories at a time. 

After the steel frame had been constructed, workers installed the tower's facade by hanging pieces of curtain wall from the steel frame. Interior work proceeded simultaneously with the facade installation. The steel superstructure had reached the 40th story by September 1929, when interior plasterwork began. The building topped out on November 13, 1929. By December, rental agents Brown, Wheelock, Harris, Vought & Company were leasing out the space at the Chrysler and Manhattan Company buildings, which aggregated . 

The 40 Wall Street Corporation gave a $12.5 million mortgage for the building's completion in December 1929, and the corporation was planning a bond issue of an equivalent value by January 1930. The building's roof was covered with scaffolding by March 1930, although Manhattan Company officials denied that they were trying to increase the building's height. The work was completed one week ahead of schedule. Several workers received craftsmanship awards in a ceremony at the end of April 1930. The building was completed by May 1, 1930, and it officially opened on May 26. In total, $24 million had been spent on construction. Four workers had died while constructing 40 Wall Street; at the time, the building had around the same mortality rate as other projects of similar scale. Paul Starrett, of the Starrett Corporation, said that "Of all the construction work which I have handled, the Bank of Manhattan was the most complicated and the most difficult, and I regard it as the most successful."

Early years

Competition for "world's tallest building" title 

Disturbed by Chrysler's victory, Shreve & Lamb wrote a newspaper article claiming that their building was the tallest, since it contained the world's highest usable floor. Afterward, 40 Wall Street was only the tallest building in Lower Manhattan.

John J. Raskob, developer of the Empire State Building (which was also designed by Shreve & Lamb), also wanted to construct the world's tallest building. The "Race into the Sky" was defined by at least five other proposals, although only the Empire State Building would survive the Wall Street Crash of 1929. The Empire State Building was completed in May 1931, becoming the world's tallest building both by roof height and spire height.

Because of late changes to the plans of both 40 Wall Street and the Chrysler Building, as well as the fact that the buildings were erected nearly simultaneously, it is uncertain whether 40 Wall Street was ever taller than the Chrysler Building. The author John Tauranac, who wrote a book about the Empire State Building's history, later stated that if 40 Wall Street had "ever had been the tallest building, they would have had bragging rights, and if they did, I certainly never heard them." If only completed structures are counted, 40 Wall Street was briefly the world's tallest completed building for one month, from the first week of May 1930 until the opening of the Chrysler Building on May 28, 1930.

Early tenants and foreclosure 
The new building housed four Manhattan Company subsidiaries: the Bank of Manhattan Trust Company, the International Acceptance Bank, the International Manhattan Company, and the Bank of Manhattan Safe Deposit Company. The Manhattan Company used the two basement levels for storage vaults; the first through sixth stories for bank operations; and the 55th floor for its officers' club. Among the first tenants was Merrill Lynch & Co. and a private lunch club called the Wall Street Club. 40 Wall Street had opened following the Wall Street Crash of 1929 and so suffered from a lack of tenants. Many of the original tenants had withdrawn their commitments to rent space in the building and, in some cases, had gone bankrupt. For the first five years of the building's existence, the 40 Wall Street Corporation was able to pay the $323,200 interest on the second mortgage-bond issue.

By early 1939, the 40 Wall Street Corporation was falling behind on rent payments, ground leases, and property taxes. That May, the Marine Midland Trust Company started foreclosure proceedings against the 40 Wall Street Corporation after the corporation defaulted on "payments of interest, taxes and other charges". In response, several bondholders formed a committee to protect their stakes; the committee expressed opposition to the proposed reorganization. In July 1939, the 40 Wall Street Corp. filed a plan to reorganize all assets that were not covered by the mortgage loans. Marine Midland became the trustee of 40 Wall Street's first-mortgage fee and its bonds on the lease in February 1940, supplanting the 40 Wall Street Corp. Marine Midland, acting on behalf of the bondholders, acquired the building that September in a transaction worth almost $11.5 million. The New York Times later described the building as being "a monument to lost hope" during that era: at the time, the building's $1,000 debentures were being sold at $108.75 apiece. The structure as a whole was worth $1.25 million, less than the 43 elevators inside the building had cost.

C. F. Noyes was hired as the building's leasing agent at the end of 1940. One of the larger tenants during this time was the Westinghouse Electric and Manufacturing Company, which in 1941 leased four floors. Other tenants included real-estate agents, lawyers, brokers, and bankers, and even a short-film theater in 1941. More tenants came during World War II, starting with the United States Department of the Navy. By 1943, the building was 80 percent leased, and that rate increased to 90 percent a year later. After the United States Department of War leased four floors in July 1944, the building reached full occupancy for the first time in its history. Many large tenants such as Prudential Financial, Westinghouse, and Western Union signed long-term leases. After several tenants left during the late 1940s, the building was completely rented again in 1951.

1946 plane crash 
On the evening of May 20, 1946, a United States Army Air Forces Beechcraft C-45F Expediter airplane crashed into 40 Wall Street's northern facade. The twin-engine plane was heading for Newark Airport on a flight originating at Lake Charles Army Air Field in Louisiana. It struck the 58th floor of the building at about 8:10 pm, creating a  hole in the masonry. The crash killed all five aboard the plane, including a WAC officer, though no one in the building or on the ground was hurt. The fuselage and the wing of the splintered plane fell and caught onto the 12th-story setback, while parts of the aircraft and pieces of brick and mortar from the building fell into the street below.

The month after the crash, the owners of 40 Wall Street filed a building application with the Department of Buildings to fix the hole in the facade. This crash was the second in New York City in less than a year; an Army B-25 bomber struck the 78th floor of the Empire State Building in July 1945, also caused by fog and poor visibility. The incident prompted the Army, in June 1946, to ban planes from landing in New York City during heavy fog. The 1946 accident was the last time an airplane accidentally crashed into a building in New York City until a 2006 plane crash on Manhattan's Upper East Side.

1950s to 1970s

Chase relocation and Webb & Knapp acquisition 
In August 1950, the building's owners submitted plans for an alteration of the building, to cost $300,000. Over the following years, the building was retrofitted with air conditioning. The directors of the Manhattan Company and Chase National Bank voted in January 1955 to merge their respective companies, and Chase Manhattan Bank was created as a result of the merger. The new company was headquartered at Chase National's previous building at 20 Pine Street, immediately north of 40 Wall Street; soon afterward, Chase constructed a structure at the neighboring 28 Liberty Street to serve as its headquarters. Meanwhile, several offices as well as a bank branch remained in 40 Wall Street. 

By 1956, the building's financial situation had improved considerably, and the 40 Wall Street Corporation's $1,000 debentures were selling for $1,550. That year, real estate developer William Zeckendorf had his company Webb and Knapp buy the leaseholds for the land from 40 Wall Street Inc., Chase, and the estate of the Iselin family. Webb and Knapp also bought 32 percent of the 40 Wall Street Corporation's stock. Webb and Knapp bought further shares in the 40 Wall Street Corporation, owning two-thirds of the corporation's shares. The firm attempted to sell 40 Wall Street in October 1957 for $15 million, but a New York Supreme Court judge enjoined the sale in November 1957 after several minority shareholders claimed the sale was illegal. 

The corporation's stockholders voted in June 1959 to sell the building for not less than $17 million. To reduce disagreements, a State Supreme Court judge ordered that an auction be held for the building. That October, stockholders held an auction for 40 Wall Street. Zeckendorf submitted the highest bid, at $18.15 million, although there was only one other bidder. At the time, 40 Wall Street was believed to be the most valuable real-estate property to be auctioned. Webb & Knapp had spent $32 million to acquire the building; excluding the auction, the remainder of the cost was used to pay Chase and the Iselin estate.

City & Central and Loeb, Rhoades operation 
Webb and Knapp sold the property to the Metropolitan Life Insurance Company in April 1960 for $20 million. Metropolitan Life leased the building back to Webb and Knapp for 99 years, under a leasehold that cost $1.2 million a year. Chase Manhattan was relocating to its new headquarters at 28 Liberty Street, and the Manufacturers Hanover Corporation was planning to relocate to the second through fifth floors, which Chase Manhattan was vacating. That September, Webb and Knapp sold the leasehold to British investors City & Central Investments (later City Centre Properties) for $15 million. The sale was finalized in November 1960, and City & Central acquired title that following month. The new operator renovated the interior and exterior. Manufacturers Hanover moved to the building in 1962, relocating $24 billion in deposits to 40 Wall Street from its old headquarters at 70 Broadway. 

City Centre sold the leasehold to Carl M. Loeb, Rhoades Company, 40 Wall Street's largest tenant, in June 1966. Other major tenants at the time included Bache & Co., which had  by 1966. Manufacturers Hanover relocated many of its offices to 600 Fifth Avenue and 55 Water Street.

1980s and early 1990s

Marcos family leasehold 
In 1982, Loeb, Rhoades sold the leasehold to a consortium of investors. The same year, the building was purchased by a group of five Germans: Anita, Christian, and Walter Hinneberg; Stephanie von Bismarck; and Joachim Ferdinand von Grumme-Douglas. The Hinneberg siblings collectively held an 80 percent stake in the building's ownership, and the other two investors each held a 10 percent stake. As part of the agreement, the owners were responsible for the building's upkeep to a certain standard. The consortium resold the leasehold on December 31, 1982, to Joseph J. and Ralph E. Bernstein for $70 million. The Bernstein brothers planned to renovate 40 Wall Street, including gilding its roof. According to a broker who was involved in the sale, the Bernsteins were initially believed to be buying the building for the wealthy Gaon family of Switzerland, as Joseph Bernstein's wife was a member of that family. 

In 1985, the Bernsteins were found to be acting on behalf of Philippine president Ferdinand E. Marcos and his wife Imelda. Around that time, 40 Wall Street and three other buildings reportedly owned by the Marcoses were placed for sale. By February 1986, the Bernsteins were contemplating paying $250 million for 40 Wall Street and two of the other buildings. After Marcos was forced out of office, the administration of his successor Corazon Aquino froze Marcos's assets within U.S. banking channels in March 1986, and the building's future became uncertain. Citicorp, which had placed a mortgage on the building, indicated in December 1986 that it would foreclose on the property. After a U.S. circuit court ruled to block the sale of the Marcos properties that November, the Aquino administration filed a lawsuit against the Marcos estate to obtain title to the buildings. Saudi arms dealer Adnan Khashoggi was subsequently accused of helping the Marcoses hide their stakes in the buildings, although he was acquitted of all racketeering charges in relation with the properties. 

Capital improvements to the building, including upgrades to its unreliable elevators, were suspended while legal proceedings were ongoing. The Aquino administration attempted in early 1989 to sell the four Marcos properties to Morris Bailey for $398 million. A federal judge ordered a foreclosure sale of the Marcos properties in August 1989, the Bailey group hoped that Citigroup would name them as the preferred bidders. At the court-ordered auction, the Bernsteins submitted the winning bid of $108.6 million after another bidder, Jack Resnick & Sons, refused to raise its bid of $108.55 million. The second mortgage with Citicorp comprised $60 million of this total. The Bernstein brothers paid the $1.5 million down payment, but they could not pay the remainder of the purchase price before the October 10, 1989, deadline. At the time, the Bernsteins were also involved in a bankruptcy proceeding in Curaçao; a special master there had refused to repeal a bankruptcy action that would have allowed the Bernsteins to pay the remainder of 40 Wall Street's purchase price. This prompted a second auction of the building's leasehold.

Resnick operation and further issues 
At a second auction in November 1989, Burton Resnick of Jack Resnick & Sons paid $77,000,100 for the leasehold, beating Citicorp's bid by $100. By then, demand for real estate in Lower Manhattan had declined in the aftermath of Black Monday in 1987. Resnick's lawyer, Howard J. Rubenstein, said his client planned to spend $30 million to $40 million renovating 40 Wall Street, although real-estate experts said the building needed closer to $50 million in renovations. Resnick decided the next year to spend $50 million on upgrades. The renovation would have included fire, electrical, and mechanical system replacement; renovation of the lobby; restoration of the facade and windows; and replacement of the elevators. The Resnicks were only able to upgrade the windows; they defaulted on their mortgage in 1991, and Citicorp took over the leasehold. Citicorp canceled financing for the renovation that year, citing concerns that the tenants might move out, including Manufacturers Hanover, which moved from the lower stories in 1992.

By the early 1990s, 40 Wall Street was 80 percent vacant. The building's maintenance had declined to the point that many tenants reported waiting 20 minutes for an elevator, and many interior spaces had been stripped to the steel frame. Homeless people were squatting in vacant floors because the building had so little security. The building was also seen as outdated, since it had no freight elevator, the upper stories were too small, and the office floors had large numbers of structural columns. In 1992, the Hinneberg siblings transferred their 80 percent ownership stake to 40 Wall Street Ltd., while Bismarck and Grumme-Douglas conveyed their combined 20 percent stake to Scandic Wall Ltd. The same year, Citicorp prepared to sell 40 Wall Street again; the asking price was reportedly as low as $10 million. The building's valuation had declined from $123 million in 1990 to $75 million in 1993. If 40 Wall Street were not sold and renovated before the end of 1992, the owners could exercise a clause to evict the leaseholder.

American International Group attempted to acquire Citicorp's stake in the building for $6.5 million, but the negotiations failed in November 1992, in what Crain's New York magazine described as "collapse of downtown real estate".  Citicorp auctioned off the building in May 1993; the bank wrote down the building's value to zero. Hong Kong firm Glorious Sun considered buying the building but ultimately decided against it. Another group from Hong Kong, the consortium Kinson Properties, agreed to lease the property, paying $8 million. Kinson planned to renovate the building for $60 million, including the lobby for $4 million and electrical and mechanical systems for $5-7 million. By the time Kinson sold the leasehold in 1995, little had been done to improve the property.

Trump lease

1990s and 2000s 

In July 1995, real estate developer Donald Trump signed a letter of intent to buy Kinson's lease and spend $100 million on renovations. The leasehold was transferred that December; The New York Times reported at the time that Trump purchased the leasehold for $8 million. Trump has given conflicting accounts about the price of the leasehold. In November 1995, Trump stated he was buying the leasehold from Kinson for $100,000. During a 2005 episode of The Apprentice, Trump claimed he only paid $1 million for the leasehold but that the property was actually worth $400 million. Trump's legal advisor, George H. Ross, restated this claim in a 2005 book. On a 2007 episode of CNBC's The Billionaire Inside, Trump again claimed he paid $1 million for the leasehold but stated the building's value as $600 million. However, in 2012, it was reported that Trump paid $10 million for the leasehold, while the building's estimated worth was $1 billion. Trump's estimate of the building's worth also conflicted with that of New York City tax assessors, who in 2004 estimated the building as being worth $90 million.

Ultimately, Trump spent $35 million on buying and refurbishing 40 Wall Street. Trump planned to convert the upper half of 40 Wall Street to residential space, leaving the bottom half as commercial space. Real-estate experts quoted in the New York Daily News said that the lowest 25 floors were extremely large, and it would not be profitable to convert them to apartments. By 1997, Trump was negotiating with hotels to occupy the lower stories of 40 Wall Street. Der Scutt Architects renovated the lobby, though the cost of converting the upper floors to residential space was ultimately too high for Trump. He tried to sell the building in 2003, expecting offers in excess of $300 million, which did not materialize. The New York Times wrote in 2004 that the building had $145 million of debt.

2010s to present 
In 2011, Duane Reade opened its flagship branch inside the former banking space. 40 Wall Street Ltd. handed its ownership stake in the building to 40 Wall Street Holdings in 2014. According to Federal Election Commission applications filed during Trump's 2016 presidential campaign, Trump had an outstanding mortgage of over $50 million on the property. By 2016, Bloomberg News estimated that 40 Wall Street was worth $550 million. At the time, Trump paid $1.65 million a year to the building's owners as part of his lease. According to Bloomberg, several of the building's 21st-century tenants included firms that were accused of scams of fraudulent activity, or were associated with people accused of such activities. Rental income from 40 Wall Street's commercial spaces increased from $30.5 million in 2014 to $43.2 million in 2018. Forbes estimated in 2020 that Trump owed Ladder Capital $138 million for 40 Wall Street as part of a loan that was to come due in 2025.

New York prosecutors were scrutinizing several of the Trump Organization's properties by 2021. The investigation found that, between 2011 and 2015, far higher values were presented to potential lenders than were reported to tax officials. The most extreme case involved 40 Wall Street, which in 2012 was cited as being worth $527 million to lenders but only $16.7 million to tax officials. By February 2023, the building had been placed on a lender watchlist because of its rising vacancy rate, which had reached 18 percent in the third quarter of 2022, and its costs, which had risen 11 percent since the mortgage was issued in 2015. The loan's servicer, Wells Fargo, was requesting an update on leasing developments from the client.

Critical reception and landmark designations 
In February 1930, the Down Town League gave an award to 40 Wall Street, recognizing it as the best building completed in Lower Manhattan during the preceding year. As Fortune magazine described Ohrstrom in 1930, "His piece de resistance thus far has been the shrewd and able financing of the Manhattan Company Building." Two years later, W. Parker Chase wrote that "no building ever constructed more thoroughly typifies the American spirit of hustle than does this extraordinary structure". In 1960, when 28 Liberty Street was being built, Architectural Forum wrote of 40 Wall Street: "Viewed from the street, the detailing of the top of this middle-aged tower becomes insignificant, but it can be said that the draftsmen in the Severance office, who spent many painstaking hours perfecting the ornamental peak more than three decades ago, have been justified at last."

Some critics regarded the skyscraper negatively. Architecture critic Robert A. M. Stern wrote in his 1987 book New York 1930 that 40 Wall Street's proximity to other skyscrapers including 70 Pine Street, 20 Exchange Place, 1 Wall Street, and the Downtown Athletic Club "had reduced the previous generation of skyscrapers to the status of foothills in a new mountain range". Eric Nash wrote in his book Manhattan Skyscrapers that 40 Wall Street's impact was blunted by its location in the middle of the block, "surrealistically situated next to the mighty Greek Revival Federal Hall National Memorial".

On December 12, 1995, the New York City Landmarks Preservation Commission designated 40 Wall Street as a city landmark, noting that the Bank of Manhattan Building was historically significant for being the headquarters of the Manhattan Company and for being part of New York City's 1929–1930 skyscraper race. Five years later, on June 16, 2000, it was added to the National Register of Historic Places, largely for the same reason as the city designation. In 2007, the building was designated as a contributing property to the Wall Street Historic District, a NRHP district.

See also 

 List of tallest buildings in New York City
 List of tallest freestanding steel structures
 List of New York City Designated Landmarks in Manhattan below 14th Street
 National Register of Historic Places listings in Manhattan below 14th Street
 Overseas landholdings of the Marcos family

References

Notes

Citations

Sources

External links 

 40 Wall Street on The Trump Organization's website
 The Trump Building on CTBUH Skyscraper Center 

1930 establishments in New York City
Art Deco architecture in Manhattan
Art Deco skyscrapers
Bank buildings in Manhattan
Bank buildings on the National Register of Historic Places in New York City
Buildings and structures on the National Register of Historic Places in Manhattan
Financial District, Manhattan
Former world's tallest buildings
Historic district contributing properties in Manhattan
Individually listed contributing properties to historic districts on the National Register in New York (state)
New York City Designated Landmarks in Manhattan
Office buildings completed in 1930
Skyscraper office buildings in Manhattan
Wall Street